Jorge Manuel Oliver (born January 23, 1981) is a Puerto Rican former swimmer, who specialized in individual medley events. As a first-born American, Oliver holds a dual citizenship, which made him eligible to compete for Puerto Rico at the Olympics.

Oliver attended Episcopal School of Jacksonville, where he earned state and district championship titles in the 100 m freestyle (1997 and 1998). While playing for the Georgia Tech Yellow Jackets in his college years, he made six top-10 lists in the school's swimming records. In 2003, Oliver graduated from the Georgia Institute of Technology in Atlanta, with a bachelor's degree in chemical engineering.

As a member of the Puerto Rican team, Oliver qualified for the men's 200 m individual medley at the 2004 Summer Olympics in Athens, by clearing a FINA B-standard entry time of 2:08.23 from the Counsilman Classic in Indianapolis, Indiana. He posted a time of 2:08.84 to lead the first heat against Cyprus' Georgios Diamantidis and Kazakhstan's Yevgeniy Ryzhkov, who was disqualified for a false start. Oliver failed to advance into the semifinals, as he shared a forty-fifth place tie with Turkey's Orel Oral in the preliminaries.

Shortly after his only Olympic appearance, Oliver worked as a volunteer assistant coach for the Georgia Tech Yellow Jackets, and eventually, for his alma mater Episcopal School of Jacksonville.

References

External links
Player Bio – Georgia Tech Yellow Jackets
Profile – Fund Leadership (Episcopal School of Jacksonville)

1981 births
Living people
Puerto Rican male swimmers
Sportspeople from Miami
Olympic swimmers of Puerto Rico
Swimmers at the 2004 Summer Olympics
Male medley swimmers
American people of Puerto Rican descent
Swimmers from Florida
Georgia Tech Yellow Jackets men's swimmers
Georgia Tech Yellow Jackets swimming coaches
Sports coaches from Miami